Hoplophoneus (Greek: "murder" (phonos), "weapon" (hoplo)) is an extinct genus of the family Nimravidae, endemic to North America during the Late Eocene to Early Oligocene epochs (35–29 mya), existing for approximately .

Taxonomy

In 2016, all North American species of Eusmilus were placed in Hoplophoneus by Paul Z. Barrett.

Description
Hoplophoneus, though not a true cat, was similar to cats in outward appearance, though with a robust body and shorter legs.

Hoplophoneus occidentalis was about the size of a large leopard and had canine teeth of only moderately-larger size. The larger H. sicarius and H. mentalis had very large upper canines and a massive flange at the front of the lower jaw.

Pathology 
An adult specimen of Hoplophoneus discovered in Badlands National Park, South Dakota, in 2010 by paleontologist Clint Boyd et al. was found to have bite marks on its skull from the teeth of another adult individual of Hoplophoneus. From examination of the wounds, it was found that the animal had been wounded by its rival's saber-teeth. Regrowth of bone around the injuries shows that the nimravid survived the attack. Similar finds also reveal that such fights were likely commonplace among nimravids and that they would often aim for the back of the skulls and eyes of their opponents.

References 

Nimravidae
Eocene carnivorans
Oligocene feliforms
Eocene animals of North America
Oligocene animals of North America
Rupelian genus extinctions
White River Fauna
Fossil taxa described in 1874
Prehistoric carnivoran genera